Walter Ufer (July 22, 1876 – August 2, 1936) was an American artist based in Taos, New Mexico. His most notable work focuses on scenes of Native American life, particularly of the Pueblo Indians.

Life and career
Ufer was born in Germany and moved with his family to Louisville, Kentucky in 1880 where Ufer grew up. After an apprenticeship as a lithographer, he went to Europe where he was a traveling journeyman.   Like many of his fellow artists with ties to Indianapolis's German-American community, he went to Germany to study; he trained in Hamburg and Dresden.  When he returned to America, he worked as a printer in Chicago and taught school, and later took classes in fine arts.  After a brief time in Chicago, he returned to Munich in 1911 for further study as an artist.  Upon his return to the US, he traveled to Taos in 1914.  There he became one of the "Taos Ten", and associated with the Taos Society of Artists. In 1917 Ufer served as president of Chicago's Palette and Chisel, Academy of Fine Arts.

In addition to his art, Ufer is known for his social activism. He helped victims of the 1918 flu epidemic being treated in the local schoolhouse and collected money for miners on strike in Madrid, New Mexico. He was also a member of the Industrial Workers of the World and follower of Leon Trotsky.

Ufer died from appendicitis. At his request, he was cremated and his ashes were spread in an arroyo (creek) near Mabel Dodge Luhan's house in Taos.

Artwork
In the 1920s, Ufer's work garnered critical and commercial success.  He showed at the Carnegie International, and became an Academician of the National Academy of Design. Ufer's New Mexico paintings are characterized by genre scenes of Native American life and landscapes executed in a high-keyed palette. One of his favorite models was a Taos Indian named Jim Mirabal who was often referred to as "Ufer's Jim."

Museums with his work include the Art Institute of Chicago, the Museum of Fine Arts, Houston, New Mexico Museum of Art, Taos Art Museum (at Fechin House) and the Indianapolis Museum of Art.

Gallery

See also
 Ernest L. Blumenschein
 E. Irving Couse
 W. Herbert Dunton
 E. Martin Hennings
 Oscar Berninghaus

References

External links
Art Institute of Chicago
Exhibition of recent paintings, an exhibition catalog containing a foreword by the artist, available from the Metropolitan Museum of Art Libraries.

1876 births
1936 deaths
19th-century American painters
19th-century male artists
20th-century American painters
20th-century male artists
20th-century American printmakers
American lithographers
American male painters
Artists from Taos, New Mexico
Artists of the American West
Federal Art Project artists
German emigrants to the United States
National Academy of Design members
Painters from Kentucky
School of the Art Institute of Chicago alumni
Taos Society of Artists
American Trotskyists
Industrial Workers of the World members
20th-century lithographers